Ekaterina Hristova Zalatareva (1868–1924) was a Bulgarian drama artist, of the first Bulgarian actor generation after the liberation of the Ottoman Empire.

Biography 
Ekaterina Zlatareva is born in Kazanlak, Stara Zagora Province, Bulgaria in 1868. During 1887 she graduates from high school in Varna. Her first acting debut was in 1890 with the role of Todorka in a theatrical play named "Ivanko" by Vasil Drumev in the theater "Osnova". During 1890 – 1892, she participates in the "Capital Dramatic Opera Company", which performs many acts in front of large audiences.

From 1892 until 1904, she performed in the new Dramatic Theater "Salza i Smyah" in Sofia. From 1904 to 1923 she plays on the scene of the National Theater in Sofia – "Ivan Vazov", the oldest and most authoritative theater in the country.

She was active as an actress in the years between 1890 and 1924.

Ekaterina Zlatareva passed away on 11 January 1927.

Major roles in theater 

 Ana Andreevna – „Revizor" of Nikolai Gogol;
 Androfoba – „Mazhemrazka of Stefan Kostov;
 Mrs Dulska – „The Morality of Mrs. Dulska" на Gabriela Zapolska;
 Kostanda – „Svekarva" by Anton Strashimirov;
 Malama – „Vampire" by Anton Strashimirov;
 Matryona– „The Power of Darkness" by Leo Tolstoy;
 Granny Froshar – „The two elders";
 Todorka – „Ivanko" by Vasil Drumev

Gallery

References 

Bulgarian artists
1868 births
1924 deaths